Naima Sultana is an Islami Oikya Jote politician and the former Member of Parliament from a reserved seat.

Career
Sultana was elected to the Parliament of Bangladesh from reserved seat as an Islami Oikya Jote candidate in 2005.

References

Islami Oikya Jote politicians
Living people
Women members of the Jatiya Sangsad
8th Jatiya Sangsad members
Year of birth missing (living people)
21st-century Bangladeshi women politicians